Karl Jakob Theodor Leybold (19 March 1786, Stuttgart - 20 July 1844, Stuttgart) was a German painter, engraver and lithographer.

Biography 
He was born to the miniaturist and copper engraver, Johann Friedrich Leybold, who also taught engraving in Vienna. It was there, at the Academy of Fine Arts, that Karl received his artistic training. One his father's associates, Eberhard von Wächter, had a major influence on his choice of subject matter and style.

In 1807, thanks to a grant from the art patron and collector, Count Moritz von Fries, he was able to travel to Rome, where he studied and worked until 1814. Then, after a few more years in Vienna, where he earned his living painting portraits, he returned to Stuttgart in 1821, where he later served as a Professor at the State Academy of Fine Arts (from 1829), and Inspector at the old Staatsgalerie (from 1842). He was named an honorary member of the Vienna Academy in 1836.

His 1826 depiction of Charon was personally praised by Goethe.

Three of his brothers were also artists: ,  and Rudolf Moritz (1806-1857). One of his sisters married the landscape painter, Gottlob Friedrich Steinkopf, who had studied with his father.

References

External links 

 
 

1786 births
1844 deaths
18th-century German painters
18th-century German male artists
German landscape painters
German portrait painters
German engravers
Academy of Fine Arts Vienna alumni
Artists from Stuttgart
19th-century German painters
19th-century German male artists